Tony Knowles may refer to:

 Tony Knowles (politician) (born 1943), former governor of the U.S. state of Alaska
 Tony Knowles (snooker player) (born 1955), English snooker player
 Tony Knowles (chemist), former president, British Columbia Institute of Technology

See also
 Tony Knowles Coastal Trail, a bike trail in Anchorage, Alaska named for the American politician